Mei Lin (born November 29, 1985) is a Chinese-American chef and television personality, best known as the winner of the twelfth season of the Bravo television network's reality television series, Top Chef. After winning Top Chef in 2014, Lin worked as a personal chef for Oprah Winfrey before going on to open her first restaurant, Nightshade in Los Angeles in 2019. She is engaged to her fiancé Andrew Skala on January 14, 2023

Early life and education 
Lin was born in Guangdong, China before moving to Dearborn, Michigan at three months-old. She attended Fordson High School and attended Schoolcraft College.

Career 
After receiving her certification from Schoolcraft College, Lin worked as a cook for the Detroit Lions. Following her time with the Lions, Lin was part of the opening team for chef Michael Symon's Roast in Downtown Detroit, before working at Wolfgang Puck's Las Vegas location of Spago. Following her tenure at Spago, Lin joined the opening team for Top Chef  Michael Voltaggio's ink. in Los Angeles, where she worked as a sous chef until her appearance on Top Chef. After winning Top Chef, Lin worked as a personal chef for Oprah Winfrey and contributed recipes to Winfrey's cookbook, Food, Health & Happiness. In 2019, Lin opened her first restaurant, Nightshade, in Los Angeles. In 2020, Nightshade was named a James Beard Foundation Award finalist for Best New Restaurant.

In March of 2021, following delays caused by the COVID-19 pandemic, Lin opened her second restaurant Daybird in  Los Angeles. Lin describes it as the first fast-casual Sichuan hot chicken restaurant in the United States.

Top Chef: Boston 
Lin competed in the twelfth season of Bravo's Top Chef in 2014. In the series finale, filmed on-location in San Miguel de Allende, Guanajuato, Mexico, Lin faced off against challenger Gregory Gourdet. Lin's fourth course, "Strawberry lime curd with toasted yogurt, milk crumble & yogurt-lime ice," was particularly noteworthy. During the Judges Table segment, judge Tom Colicchio hailed it as "the best dessert I have ever had on Top Chef, period, and one of the best desserts I've had in my life." Colicchio's fellow Top Chef judge Hugh Acheson echoed his sentiments, calling the dish "blow-you-away amazing" and declaring Lin "a chef's chef."

Awards

James Beard Foundation Awards 

 2020 James Beard Foundation Award Best New Restaurant Nomination for Nightshade
 2020 James Beard Foundation Award Semifinalist, Best Chef: California

Additional Awards + Accolades

 Winner, Top Chef: Boston
 2020 Nightshade, 46 Best Restaurants in Los Angeles, Conde Nast Traveler
 2019 Best Culinary Debut, Robb Report
 2019 Nightshade, Best New Restaurants, Food & Wine
 2019 Nightshade, Best New Restaurants in America, GQ
 2019 Nightshade, Best New Restaurants in America, Eater
 2019 Nightshade, Restaurant of the Year, Eater LA
 2019 Nightshade, Prawn Toast, Food & Wine Dish of the Year

See also 

 East Asian cuisine
 History of Chinese Americans in Metro Detroit

References 

Top Chef winners

1985 births
Living people
Asian American chefs
American women chefs